The Christian Church (Disciples of Christ) is a mainline Protestant Christian denomination in the United States and Canada. The denomination started with the Restoration Movement during the Second Great Awakening, first existing during the 19th century as a loose association of churches working towards Christian unity, then slowly forming quasi-denominational structures through missionary societies, regional associations, and an international convention. In 1968, the Disciples of Christ officially adopted a denominational structure at which time a group of churches left to remain nondenominational.

It is often referred to as The Christian Church, The Disciples of Christ, The Disciples, or the DOC. The Christian Church was a charter participant in the formation of the World Council of Churches (WCC) and of the Federal Council of Churches (now the National Council of Churches), and it continues to be engaged in ecumenical conversations. 

The Disciples' local churches are congregationally governed. In 2008 there were 679,563 members in 3,714 congregations in North America.  By 2015, this number had declined to a baptized membership of 497,423 in 3,267 congregations, of whom about 306,905 were active members, while approximately 177,000 attended Sunday services each week. In 2018, the denomination reported 380,248 members with 124,437 people in average worship attendance.

History
The Christian Church (Disciples of Christ) traces its roots to the Stone-Campbell Movement on the American frontier. The Movement is so named because it started as two distinct but similar movements, each without knowledge of the other, during the Second Great Awakening in the early 19th century. The first of these two groups, led by Barton W. Stone began at Cane Ridge, Bourbon County, Kentucky. The group called themselves simply Christians. The second, began in western Pennsylvania and Virginia (now West Virginia), led by Thomas Campbell and his son, Alexander Campbell. Because the founders wanted to abandon all denominational labels, they used the biblical names for the followers of Jesus that they found in the Bible.

Stone

In 1801, the Cane Ridge Revival in Kentucky planted the seed for a movement in Kentucky and the Ohio River Valley to disassociate from denominationalism.  In 1803 Stone and others withdrew from the Kentucky Presbytery and formed the Springfield Presbytery. The defining event of the Stone wing of the movement was the publication of the Last Will and Testament of the Springfield Presbytery, at Cane Ridge, Kentucky, in 1804. "The Last Will" is a brief document in which Stone and five others announced their withdrawal from Presbyterianism and their intention to be solely part of the body of Christ. The writers appealed for the unity of all who follow Jesus, suggested the value of congregational self-governance, and lifted the Bible as the source for understanding the will of God. They denounced the use of the Westminster Confession of Faith as divisive.

Soon, they adopted the name "Christian" to identify their group. Thus, the remnants of the Springfield Presbytery became the Christian Church. It is estimated that the Christian Church numbered about 12,000 by 1830.

Campbells

Independently of Stone, Thomas Campbell published the Declaration and Address of the Christian Association of Washington, (Pennsylvania) in 1809. In The Declaration and Address, he set forth some of his convictions about the church of Jesus Christ, emphasizing Christian unity and the restoration of the New Testament church. He organized the Christian Association of Washington, not as a church but as an association of persons seeking to grow in faith. On May 4, 1811, however, the Christian Association constituted itself as a congregationally governed church. With the building it then constructed at Brush Run, it became known as Brush Run Church.

When their study of the New Testament led the reformers to begin to practice baptism by immersion, the nearby Redstone Baptist Association invited Brush Run Church to join with them for the purpose of fellowship. The reformers agreed provided that they would be "allowed to preach and to teach whatever they learned from the Scriptures."

Thus began a sojourn for the reformers among the Baptists within the Redstone Baptist Association (1815–1824).  While the reformers and the Baptists shared the same beliefs in baptism by immersion and congregational polity, it was soon clear that the reformers were not traditional Baptists. Within the Redstone Association, the differences became intolerable to some of the Baptist leaders, when Alexander Campbell began publishing a journal, The Christian Baptist, promoting reform. Campbell anticipated the conflict and moved his membership to a congregation of the Mahoning Baptist Association in 1824.

In 1827, the Mahoning Association appointed reformer Walter Scott as an Evangelist.  Through Scott's efforts, the Mahoning Association grew rapidly. In 1828, Thomas Campbell visited several of the congregations formed by Scott and heard him preach. The elder Campbell realized that Scott was bringing an important new dimension to the movement with his approach to evangelism.

Several Baptist associations began disassociating congregations that refused to subscribe to the Philadelphia Confession. The Mahoning Association came under attack. In 1830, the Mahoning Baptist Association disbanded. Alexander ceased publication of The Christian Baptist. In January 1831, he began publication of the Millennial Harbinger.

1832 Merger

The two groups united at High Street Meeting House, Lexington, Kentucky, with a handshake between Barton W. Stone and "Raccoon" John Smith, on Saturday, December 31, 1831. Smith had been chosen, by those present, to speak on behalf of the followers of the Campbells. While contemporaneous accounts are clear that the handshake took place on Saturday, some historians have changed the date of the merger to Sunday, January 1, 1832. The 1832 date has become generally accepted. The actual difference is about 20 hours.

Two representatives of those assembled were appointed to carry the news of the union to all the churches: John Rogers, for the Christians and "Raccoon" John Smith for the reformers. Despite some challenges, the merger succeeded.

With the merger, there was the challenge of what to call the new movement. Clearly, finding a Biblical, non-sectarian name was important. Stone wanted to continue to use the name "Christians." Alexander Campbell insisted upon "Disciples of Christ". Walter Scott and Thomas Campbell sided with Stone, but the younger Campbell had strong reasons and would not yield. As a result, both names were used.

National Conventions

In 1849, the first National Convention was held at Cincinnati, Ohio. Alexander Campbell had concerns that holding conventions would lead the movement into divisive denominationalism.  He did not attend the gathering. Among its actions, the convention elected Alexander Campbell its President and created the American Christian Missionary Society (ACMS).

The formation of a missionary society set the stage for further "co-operative" efforts. By the end of the century, the Foreign Christian Missionary Society and the Christian Women's Board of Missions were also engaged in missionary activities. Forming the ACMS did not reflect a consensus of the entire movement. Sponsorship of missionary activities became a divisive issue. In the succeeding decades, for some congregations and their leaders, co-operative work through missionary societies and the adoption of instrumental music in church worship was straying too far from their conception of the early church. After the American Civil War, the schism grew. While there was no disagreement over the need for evangelism, many believed that missionary societies were not authorized by scripture and would compromise the autonomy of local congregations.  This became one important factor leading to the separation of the Churches of Christ from the Christian Church (Disciples of Christ).

Journals
From the beginning of the movement, the free exchange of ideas among the people was fostered by the journals published by its leaders. Alexander Campbell published The Christian Baptist and The Millennial Harbinger. Barton W. Stone published The Christian Messenger.  In a respectful way, both men routinely published the contributions of others whose positions were radically different from their own.

Following Campbell's death in 1866, journals continued to keep the discussion and conversation alive. Between 1870 and 1900, two journals emerged as the most prominent. The Christian Standard was edited and published by Isaac Errett of Cincinnati. The Christian Evangelist was edited and published by J. H. Garrison from St. Louis. The two men enjoyed a friendly rivalry, and kept the dialog going within the movement. A third journal became part of the conversation with the publication in 1884 of The Christian Oracle, later to become The Christian Century, with an interdenominational appeal. In 1914, Garrison's Christian Publishing company was purchased by R. A. Long, who then established a non-profit corporation, "The Christian Board of Publication" as the Brotherhood publishing house.

First Division
In 1906, the U.S. Religious Census listed Churches of Christ for the first time as a group which was separate and distinct from the Disciples of Christ. However, the division had been growing for years, with published reports as early as 1883. The most obvious distinction between the two groups was the Churches of Christ rejecting the use of musical instruments in worship. The controversy over musical instruments began in 1860, when some congregations introduced organs, traditionally associated with wealthier, denominational churches. More basic were the underlying approaches to Biblical interpretation. The Churches of Christ permitted only those practices found in accounts of New Testament worship. They could find no New Testament documentation of the use of instrumental music in worship. The Disciples, by contrast, considered permissible any practices that the New Testament did not expressly forbid. While music and the approach to missionary work were the most visible issues, there were also some deeper ones. The process that led to the separation had begun prior to the American Civil War.

The Brotherhood 
In the early 20th century a central point of conflict for the remaining Christian Churches was cooperative missionary efforts, both nationally and internationally. Several missionary societies had already been established, and the congregations that contributed to these societies and attended the national convention became known as "cooperative" and began referring to the larger grouping of these congregations as "the Brotherhood." In 1917 the National Convention became the International Convention of Christian Churches (Disciples of Christ) with the incorporation of Canadian Disciples. In 1920, three separate missionary societies merged into the United Christian Missionary Society in 1920, which undertook missions work both in the "homeland" and abroad. Over the next fifty years, the UCMS was the largest agency of the Brotherhood. The National Benevolent Association was also established during the early 20th century as a social services ministry providing assistance to orphans, the elderly and the disabled. 

The congregations that did not participate were known as "independents." Until the cooperative churches underwent the process of restructure in the 1960s, the cooperatives and independents coexisted together under the same identity, but were following different paths by the 1940s, with the independents forming the North American Christian Convention in 1947.

While issues of ecclesiology were at the forefront of the growing division, theological issues also divided the two groups, with the cooperative churches largely adopting the new methods of Biblical analysis developed in the late 19th century.

Restructure
Following World War II, it became obvious that the organizations that had been developed in previous decades no longer effectively met the needs of the postwar era.  After a number of discussions throughout the 1950s, the 1960 International Convention of Christian Churches adopted a process to "restructure" the entire organization. The Commission on Restructure, chaired by Granville T. Walker, held its first meeting on October 30 & November 1, 1962. In 1968, the International Convention of Christian Churches (Disciples of Christ) adopted the commission's proposed Provisional Design of the Christian Church (Disciples of Christ). Soon The Provisional Design became The Design.

Second Division Made Official 
The Brotherhood's adoption of The Design made the earlier split between the cooperative and independent churches official. Under The Design, all churches in the 1968 yearbook of Christian Churches (Disciples of Christ) were automatically recognized as part of the Christian Church (Disciples of Christ). In the years that followed, many of the Independent Christian Church Congregations requested formal withdrawal from the yearbook. Many of those congregations became part of the Christian churches and churches of Christ.

Beliefs and practices
As a congregational denomination, each Disciple congregation determines the nature of its worship, study, Christian service, and witness to the world. Through belief in the priesthood of all believers, Disciples also practice freedom of interpretation among its members, with only baptism and confession of Christ as Lord required.

Doctrine and interpretation

Early members of the Stone-Campbell Movement adopted the slogan "In essentials, Unity; In non-essentials, Liberty; and in all things, Charity." For modern disciples the one essential is the acceptance of Jesus Christ as Lord and Savior, and obedience to him in baptism. There is no requirement to give assent to any other statement of belief or creed. Nor is there any official interpretation of the Bible. Hierarchical doctrine was traditionally rejected by Disciples as human-made and divisive, and subsequently, freedom of belief and scriptural interpretation allows many Disciples to question or even deny beliefs common in doctrinal churches such as the Incarnation, the Trinity, and the Atonement. Beyond the essential commitment to follow Jesus, there is a tremendous freedom of belief and interpretation. As the basic teachings of Jesus are studied and applied to life, there is the freedom to interpret Jesus' teaching in different ways. As would be expected from such an approach, there is a wide diversity among Disciples in what individuals and congregations believe. It is not uncommon to find individuals who seemingly hold diametrically opposed beliefs within the same congregation affirming one another's journeys of faith as sisters and brothers in Christ.

Modern Disciples reject the use of creeds as "tests of faith", that is, as required beliefs, necessary to be accepted as a follower of Jesus. Although Disciples respect the great creeds of the church as informative affirmations of faith, they are never seen as binding. Since the adoption of The Design of the Christian Church (Disciples of Christ), in 1968, Disciples have celebrated a sense of unity in reading the preamble to the Design publicly.

Worship and Communion
Most congregations sing hymns, read from the Old and New Testaments, hear the word of God proclaimed through sermon or other medium and extend an invitation to become Christ's Disciples.

As an integral part of worship in most Disciple congregations practice weekly celebrations of the Lord's Supper, often referred to by Disciples as Communion. Through the observance of Communion, individuals are invited to acknowledge their faults and sins, to remember the death and resurrection of Jesus Christ, to remember their baptism, and to give thanks for God's redeeming love. Because Disciples believe that the invitation to the table comes from Jesus Christ, Communion is open to all who confess that Jesus Christ is Lord, regardless of their denominational affiliation. For most Disciples, Communion is understood as the symbolic presence of Jesus within the gathered community.

Baptism
Most Disciple congregations practice believer's baptism in the form of immersion, believing it to be the form used in the New Testament. The experiences of yielding to Christ in being buried with him in the waters of baptism and rising to a new life have profound meaning for the church. While most congregations exclusively practice baptism by immersion, Disciples also accept other forms of baptism including infant baptism.

Ecumenical efforts

The Disciples celebrate their oneness with all who seek God through Jesus Christ, throughout time and regardless of location. In local communities, congregations share with churches of other denominations in joint worship and in community Christian service. Ecumenical cooperation and collaboration with other Christian Communions has long been practiced by the Regions.

At the General Church level, the Christian Unity and Interfaith Ministries Unity (CUIM) coordinates the ecumenical and interfaith activities of the church. The Disciples continues to relate to the National Council of Churches and Canadian Council of Churches, both of which it was a founding member. It shares in the dialog and in the theological endeavors of the World Council of Churches. The Disciples has been a full participant in the Consultation on Church Union since it began in the 1960s. It continues to support those ongoing conversations which have taken on the title Churches Uniting in Christ.

The Disciples have two full communion partners: the United Church of Christ, since 1989, and the United Church of Canada, since 2019. These three denominations all share mutual full communion with each other. CUIM describes these partnerships as the proclamation of "mutual recognition of their sacraments and ordained ministry." Ordained Disciple ministers are able to directly serve in the United Church of Christ without having to seek additional qualifications. 
Additionally, the Disciples combined their overseas ministries with the United Church of Christ in 1996. Known as Global Ministries, it is a common agency of both denominations with a joint staff and is a continuance of decades of cooperative work in global missions.

While the Disciples of Christ and United Church of Canada have entered full communion, the recentness of the agreement means that the provisions for mutual recognition of clergy are not yet finalized and adopted.

Ordained Ministry
The Disciples believe in the priesthood of all believers, in that all people baptized are called to minister to others with diverse spiritual gifts. The Disciples view their Order of Ministry as a specific subset of all believers who are called with spiritual gifts specifically suited for pastoral ministry. Congregations use different terms to refer to persons in the Order of Ministry including Pastor and Reverend but most call them Ministers, including the denomination's governing documents.

Congregations sponsor members seeking ordination or commissioning as a Minister, and Regional Ministries organize committees to oversee the process. Ordination can be achieved by obtaining a Master of Divinity from a theological institution, which does not have to be an institution associated with the Disciples. Ordination can also be achieved through an "Apprentice" track which has candidates shadow ordained ministers. Finally, Ministers can be Commissioned, a shorter process for seminary students and those seeking short-term ministry in a Region. Regional requirements for ministry vary. Ordination is made official through a service which includes members of the church, clergy, and Regional Minister laying their hands on the candidate as the ordaining act. Ecumenical representatives are often included to emphasize the Disciples' desire for Christian unity.

Disciples recognize the ordinations of the United Church of Christ as do they for Disciples.

A General Commission on the Order of Ministry exists to interpret and review definitions of ministry, give oversight to Regions and congregations, provide other support, and maintain the standing of Regional Ministers and Ministers of General (National) Ministries.

LGBTQ inclusion 
In 1977, the General Assembly of the denomination debated resolutions about homosexuality for the first time; a resolution condemning the "homosexual lifestyle" was defeated by the Assembly and a resolution to ban gay people from the ordained ministry was referred to the General Minister and President for further study. At the next General Assembly two years later, the Assembly approved a resolution that declared "The ordination of persons who engage in homosexual practices is not in accord with God's will," but concurrently declared that "The Christian Church (Disciples of Christ) intends to continue the current pattern of assigning responsibility to the regions with respect to the nurture, certification, and ordination of ministers." Since then, some regions have ordained LGBTQ ministers before the denomination officially supported it. Concerns about LGBTQ people continued to be an issue at the General Assembly, but resolutions that called on more civil rights protections for LGBTQ people were passed with overwhelming majorities and resolutions to ban the "homosexual lifestyle" continued to be rejected.

In 2011, the Christian Church (Disciples of Christ) stated that "Disciples do not have a formal policy on same-sex marriage. Different congregations have the autonomy to discern on issues such as this one".  In 2013, the Disciples of Christ voted in favor of a resolution affirming all members regardless of sexual orientation. After same-sex marriage was legalized in the US, the denomination reiterated that it leaves "all decisions of policy on same-sex marriage to local congregations".

In 2019, the General Assembly passed a resolution specifically affirming that transgender and gender non-conforming people are welcome in the Christian Church (Disciples of Christ).

Disciples LGBTQ+ Alliance provides resources to congregations that want to be certified as "Open and Affirming" to show that they are accepting of all gender identities and sexual orientations. The Alliance was founded as the Gay, Lesbian, and Affirming Disciples Alliance (GLAD) during the 1979 General Assembly. The Disciples of Christ supports the right to an abortion.

Structure
The structure of the Disciples is unique among Mainline Protestant churches. The Design, the governing document of the denomination, describes three "expressions" of the church: congregational, regional, and general. Each of these expressions are "characterized by its integrity, self-governance, authority, rights, and responsibilities." In relating to each other, they work in covenant and not authority to support the ministry and work of the church.

Congregations
Congregations of the Disciples are self-governing in the tradition of congregational polity. They call their own Ministers, select their own leadership, own their own property, and manage their own affairs.

In Disciples congregations, the priesthood of all believers finds its expression in worship and Christian service. Congregations elect and ordain lay persons as Elders to share in duties of congregational ministry with the staff ministers, including visiting the sick and administering communion to them, providing spiritual guidance for the congregation, and presiding over Communion during worship, either with or without the staff ministers.

Regional Ministries

The Regional Churches of the Christian Church provide resources for leadership development and opportunities for Christian fellowship beyond the local congregation. They have taken responsibility for the nurture and support of those individuals seeking to discern God's call to service as ordained or licensed ministers. Typically, they organize summer camping experiences for children and youth. Currently there are 31 regions of the Christian Church.

Regional churches assist congregations who are seeking ministers and ministers who are seeking congregations. Regional leadership is available on request to assist congregations that face conflict. Though they have no authority to direct the life of any congregation, the Regional Churches are analogous to the middle judicatories of other denominations.

General Ministries

The Christian Church (Disciples of Christ) at the "General Church" level consists of a number of self-governing agencies, which focus upon specific Christian witnesses to the world. The church agencies report to the General Assembly, which meets biennially in odd-numbered years and is an assembly of representatives selected by congregations and ordained ministers with standing in the denomination. The General Minister and President (GMP) is the lead pastor for the denomination and the chief executive officer of the legal corporation. Following the covenantal understanding of the denomination, the GMP does not have direct executive power over the General Ministries, regions, or congregations. The GMP is elected to a six-year term by the General Assembly, with the option for a second term.

The current General Minister and President is Teresa Hord Owens. When she was elected in 2017, Owens was the first black woman to lead a mainline denomination as their chief executive. Her presidency followed the presidency of Sharon E. Watkins, the first woman to lead a mainline denomination as their chief executive.

The General Ministries are:
 Office of the General Minister and President: executive office for the denomination and includes communications, fundraising for the denominational mission fund, Week of Compassion, and anti-racist/pro-reconciliation efforts
 Central Pastoral Office for Hispanic Ministries-Obra Hispana: promotes, undergirds, and coordinates work of Disciples Hispanic Ministries and Spanish speaking and bilingual congregations
 Christian Board of Publication-Chalice Press: denominational publishing house
 Christian Church Foundation: provides assistance on giving and endowments
 Christian Unity and Interfaith Ministry (formerly the Council on Christian Unity): ecumenical and interfaith engagement and dialogue
 Disciples Church Extension Fund: support for congregational finances, new church ministry, and congregational renewal
 Disciples Home Missions: provides support for congregational and local ministries including education and faith formation, church vocations, environmental justice, immigration and refugee ministries, families and children, youth, young adults, men's and women's ministries, and volunteering.
 Disciples of Christ Historical Society: maintains archives for the denomination and the larger Stone-Campbell Movement
 Division of Overseas Ministries-Global Ministries: global mission and volunteer work in joint partnership with the United Church of Christ
 Higher Education and Leadership Ministries: works with higher education partners and theological education partners and provides leadership development
 National Benevolent Association: partners with and connects independent health and social service ministries to Disciples and each other
 National Convocation: historical association of Black Disciple congregations that merged with the White Disciples in 1968, now continues as an association connecting and supporting black members and congregations
 North American Pacific/Asian Disciples: association of Pacific and Asian-American Disciples members and congregations
 Pension Fund of the Christian Church: provides pensions and investment/savings products to clergy and lay employees of Stone-Campbell/Restoration Movement churches and organizations.

One highly popular and respected General Agency program is the "Week of Compassion," named for the special offering to fund the program when it began in the 1950s. The Week of Compassion is the disaster relief and Third World development agency. It works closely with Church World Service and church-related organizations in countries around the world where disasters strike, providing emergency aid.

The General Church has challenged the entire denomination to work for a 2020 Vision for the first two decades of the 21st Century. Together the denomination is well on the way to achieving its four foci:
 Seeking racial justice, which it describes as becoming a pro-reconciling/anti-racist church.
 Forming 1,000 new congregations across the United States and Canada by 2020.
 Seeking God's transformation of 1,000 existing Congregations in ways that will renew their witness.
 Working to nurture leadership for newly formed and transformed congregations.

Chalice logo
The logo of the Christian Church (Disciples of Christ) is a red chalice with a white St. Andrew's Cross. The chalice represents the centrality of Communion to the life of the church. The cross of Saint Andrew is a reminder of the ministry of each person and the importance of evangelism, and recalls the denomination's Scottish Presbyterian ancestry.

After the 1968 General Assembly, the Administrative Committee charged a sub-committee with the task of proposing a symbol for the church. Hundreds of designs were submitted, but none seemed right. By November the Deputy General Minister and President, William Howland, suggested that the committee's staff consultant and chairperson agree on a specific proposal and bring it back to the committee: that meant Robert L. Friedly of the Office of Interpretation and Ronald E. Osborn.

On January 20, 1970, the two men sat down for lunch. With a red felt-tip pen, Osborn began to scrawl a Saint Andrew's cross circumscribed inside a chalice on his placemat.

Immediately, Friedly dispatched the crude drawing to Bruce Tilsley, a commercial artist and member of Central Christian Church of Denver, with the plea that he prepare an artistic version of the ideas. Tilsley responded with two or three sketches, from which was selected the now-familiar red chalice. Use of the proposed symbol became so prevalent that there was little debate when official adoption was considered at the 1971 General Assembly.

Because most congregations call themselves "Christian Churches," the chalice has become a simple way to identify Disciples of Christ Churches through signage, letterhead, and other forms of publicity.

Membership trends
The Christian Church (Disciples of Christ) has experienced a very significant loss of membership since the middle of the 20th century. Membership peaked in 1958 at just under 2 million. In 1993, membership dropped below 1 million. In 2009, the denomination reported 658,869 members in 3,691 congregations. As of 2010, the five states with the highest adherence rates were Kansas, Missouri, Iowa, Kentucky and Oklahoma.  The states with the largest absolute number of adherents were Missouri, Texas, Indiana, Kentucky and Ohio.

Affiliated academic institutions
From the very beginnings of the movement, Disciples have founded institutions of higher learning. Alexander Campbell taught young leaders and founded Bethany College. The movement established similar schools, especially in the years following the American Civil War.

Because intellectual and religious freedom are important values for the Disciples of Christ, the colleges, universities, and seminaries founded by its congregations do not seek to indoctrinate students or faculty with a sectarian point of view.

In the 21st century, the relationship between the Christian Church (Disciples of Christ) and its affiliated universities is the purview of Higher Education and Leadership Ministries (HELM), an agency of the General Church.

Universities and colleges
 Barton College – Wilson, North Carolina
 Bethany College – Bethany, West Virginia
 Chapman University – Orange, California
 Columbia College – Columbia, Missouri
 Culver-Stockton College – Canton, Missouri
 Drury University – Springfield, Missouri
 Eureka College – Eureka, Illinois
 Hiram College – Hiram, Ohio
 Jarvis Christian College – Hawkins, Texas
 University of Lynchburg – Lynchburg, Virginia
 Midway University – Midway, Kentucky
 Texas Christian University – Fort Worth, Texas
 Tougaloo College – Tougaloo, Mississippi
 Transylvania University – Lexington, Kentucky
 William Woods University – Fulton, Missouri

Seminaries and theological institutions
The Disciples have four seminaries and divinity schools directly affiliated with the denomination. These institutions have an ecumenical student body, a reflection of the Disciples' focus on church unity. They are:
 Brite Divinity School – Fort Worth, Texas
 Christian Theological Seminary – Indianapolis, Indiana
 Lexington Theological Seminary – Lexington, Kentucky
 Phillips Theological Seminary – Tulsa, Oklahoma

The Disciples have three additional institutions that provide supplementary education and community living for ecumenical theological institutions. They are:
 Disciples Divinity House of the University of Chicago – Chicago, Illinois
 Disciples Divinity House at Vanderbilt – Nashville, Tennessee
 Disciples Seminary Foundation – Claremont, California (partners with several ecumenical seminaries and schools of religion in the western United States)

Ecumenical relations
The Disciples of Christ maintains ecumenical relations with the Pontifical Council for Promoting Christian Unity. It is also affiliated with other ecumenical organizations such as Churches Uniting in Christ, Christian Churches Together, the National Council of Churches and the World Council of Churches. It maintains Ordained Ministerial Partner Standing with the United Church of Christ, which means that clergy ordained in the Disciples of Christ may also serve in the United Church of Christ. It is affiliated with the Disciples Ecumenical Consultative Council and the World Communion of Reformed Churches.

Prominent members

 Jesse Moren Bader, evangelist
 William Barber II, Disciples pastor and President of North Carolina NAACP
 Andy Beshear, current Governor of Kentucky
 Edgar Cayce, American mystic
 Fred Craddock, professor and preacher
 J. William Fulbright, U.S. Senator from Arkansas
 James A. Garfield, 20th President of the United States, ordained Disciples minister, Principal (President) of Western Reserve Eclectic Institute (now named Hiram College) in Hiram, Ohio
 Murry Hammond, singer 
 Grey DeLisle, voice actress
 Dean Hess, US Air Force Pilot
 Ben Hogan, professional golfer, tied for fourth all-time with nine career professional major championships
 Lyndon Baines Johnson, 36th President of the United States
 Jim Jones, cult leader, who was ordained as a Disciples minister before the denomination was organized in 1968; at that time requirements for ordination varied greatly in different regions and congregations. Two investigations were undertaken in 1974 and 1977 by the denomination that did not find any wrongdoings. No rules or precedent existed for the Disciples for removing ministers, and the Disciples responded to the Jonestown mass killings with significant changes for ministerial ethics and the process to remove ministers from the list of ordained.
 Marinda Lemert (1811–1891), religious writer who argued for the ordination of women
 Frances McDormand, actress; winner of the Triple Crown of Acting
 James Clark McReynolds, United States Supreme Court Justice (1914–1941)

 Harold Bell Wright early 20th century author; pastor at churches in the association prior to becoming an author. The author is best known for the novel The _Shepherd_of_the_Hills_(novel), and is the first fiction author to sell 1 million copies.

 John Muir, Scottish founder of the environmental movement. Raised in the church, but later left it.
 Francis Gary Powers, American CIA U-2 spy plane pilot shot down while flying a reconnaissance mission in Soviet Union airspace
 Betsy Price, Former mayor of Fort Worth, Texas (2011–2021), the 16th most populous city in the United States
 Ronald Reagan, 40th President of the United States, baptized into the Disciples as a youth, and graduated from the Disciples' Eureka College, but a member of Bel Air Presbyterian Church in his later years. He married Nancy at The Little Brown Church in Studio City, California, a Disciples Church.
 Susanna Carson Rijnhart, Tibetan explorer, missionary
 Gene Robinson, raised in a Disciples church, later joined the Episcopal Church in the United States of America and became the first openly gay priest to be consecrated as a bishop in a major Christian denomination believing in the historic episcopate
 Colonel Harlan Sanders, founder of Kentucky Fried Chicken
 Tom Selleck, actor
 John Stamos, actor
 Preston Taylor, African American minister, businessperson and philanthropist; founder of the National Christian Missionary Convention
 William Thomas Jr., actor
 Marion Tinsley, considered the all-time greatest human Checkers player
 Jessie Trout, Canadian missionary in Japan, author, Japanese-American internment camp worker, co-founder of the Christian Women's Fellowship (1950) and the International Christian Women's Fellowship (1953)
 Emily Harvie Thomas Tubman, businesswoman and philanthropist from Augusta, Georgia, early supporter of the Restoration Movement and correspondent of Alexander Campbell. He financed the construction of many Christian churches in the United States and donated to several Disciples-affiliated colleges.
 Roger Williams (U.S. politician), Congressman representing Texas' 25th District in the U.S. House of Representatives. Former Secretary of State of Texas (2004–2007)
 John Wooden, legendary UCLA basketball coach, raised in a Disciples Church in Martinsville, Indiana

See also

 First Christian Church, a typical name for many Disciples congregations, links to a disambiguation page with a list of congregations
 National City Christian Church, the Disciples' main congregation in Washington, D.C.
 DisciplesWorld, now-defunct magazine that covered the denomination
Restoration Movement
Churches of Christ, separated officially in 1906
Christian churches and churches of Christ, separated officially in 1968
 World Convention of Churches of Christ
Christianity

Notes

References

Sources
 
 Campbell, Thomas (1809). The Declaration and Address
 
 Challen, James (editor), Biographical Sketch of Alexander Campbell, Ladies' Christian Annual, March, 1857 (Volume VI, No. 3), Philadelphia: James Challen, Publisher. Pages 81–90.Online Edition
 Corey, Stephen (1953). Fifty Years of Attack and Controversy St. Louis, MO: Committee on the publication of the Corey manuscript
 
 Davis, M. M. (1915).  How the Disciples Began and Grew, A Short History of the Christian Church, Cincinnati: The Standard Publishing Company
 Garrison, Winfred Earnest and DeGroot, Alfred T. (1948). The Disciples of Christ, A History, St Louis, Missouri: The Bethany Press
 
 
 Marshall, Robert; Dunlavy, John; M'Nemar, Richard; Stone, B. W.; Thompson, John; and Purviance, David (1804). The Last Will and Testament of the Springfield Presbytery
 McAlister, Lester G. and Tucker, William E. (1975), Journey in Faith: A History of the Christian Church (Disciples of Christ) - St. Louis, Chalice Press, 
 
 
 Watkins, Sharon E. (publisher) (2006). Yearbook & Directory of the Christian Church (Disciples of Christ) - 2006, Indianapolis: The Office of The General Minister and President
 Williams, D. Newell (2008). The Christian Church (Disciples of Christ): A Reformed North American Mainstream Moderate Denomination, presentation given during the Christian Church (Disciples of Christ) Consultation on "Becoming a Multicultural and Inclusive Church," March 27, 2008. Retrieved January 4, 2010.

Further reading
 Butchart, Reuben. The Disciples of Christ in Canada Since 1930... in series, Canadian Headquarters' Publications. Toronto, Ont.: Churches of Christ (Disciples), 1949. xv, 674 p.

External links

 Official website
 Disciples of Christ Historical Society
 Profile of Christian Church (Disciples of Christ) on the Association of Religion Data Archives website

 
Restoration Movement
Congregationalism in the United States
Members of the World Council of Churches
Christian denominations founded in the United States
Members of the National Council of Churches
Restoration Movement denominations
Religion in Indianapolis